Tulfes is a municipality in the district of Innsbruck-Land in the Austrian state of Tyrol, located 12 km east of Innsbruck and 6 km above Hall in Tirol. The village was mentioned as “Tellevo” for the first time in 1240. Main source of income is tourism. Tulfes became a popular area of settlement due to the cities of Innsbruck and Hall.

Population

References

External links

 Municipality Tulfes: Official website of the municipality in the Hall-Wattens region

Cities and towns in Innsbruck-Land District